Grey East was a federal electoral district represented in the House of Commons of Canada from 1872 to 1917. It was located in the province of Ontario. This riding was created in 1872 from parts of Grey North and Grey South ridings.

In 1872, the County of Grey was divided into three ridings: Grey North, Grey East and Grey South.

The East Riding consisted of the Townships of Proton, Melancthon, Osprey, Artemisia, Collingwood, Euphrasia and St. Vincent. In 1882, the riding was redefined to exclude the township or Artemesia, and include the village of Shelburne and the town of Meaford.

In 1903, The east riding was redefined to consist of the townships of Artemesia, Collingwood, Euphrasia, Holland, Osprey and Proton, the town of Thornbury, and the villages of Dundalk and Markdale.

The electoral district was abolished in 1914 when it was redistributed between Grey North and Grey Southeast ridings.

Election results

|}

|}

|}

|}

|}

|}

|}

|}

|}

|}

|}

See also 

 List of Canadian federal electoral districts
 Past Canadian electoral districts

External links 
Riding history from the Library of Parliament

Former federal electoral districts of Ontario